The Cyclades are an island group in the Aegean Sea, southeast of mainland Greece and a former administrative prefecture of Greece. They are one of the island groups which constitute the Aegean archipelago. The name refers to the islands around ("cyclic", κυκλάς) the sacred island of Delos. The largest island of the Cyclades is Naxos, however the most populated is Syros.

History

The significant Late Neolithic and Early Bronze Age Cycladic culture is best known for its schematic, flat sculptures carved out of the islands' pure white marble centuries before the great Middle Bronze Age Minoan civilization arose in Crete to the south. (These figures have been looted from burials to satisfy a thriving Cycladic antiquities market since the early 20th century.)

A distinctive Neolithic culture amalgamating Anatolian and mainland Greek elements arose in the western Aegean before 4000 BCE, based on emmer and wild-type barley, sheep and goats, pigs, and tuna that were apparently speared from small boats (Rutter). Excavated sites include Chalandriani, Phylakopi, Skarkos, Saliagos and Kephala (on Kea) with signs of copperworking, Each of the small Cycladic islands could support no more than a few thousand people, though Late Cycladic boat models show that fifty oarsmen could be assembled from the scattered communities (Rutter), and when the highly organized palace-culture of Crete arose, the islands faded into insignificance, with the exception of Delos, which retained its archaic reputation as a sanctuary throughout antiquity and until the emergence of Christianity.

Archaeology

The first archaeological excavations of the 1880s were followed by systematic work by the British School at Athens and by Christos Tsountas, who investigated burial sites on several islands in 1898–1899 and coined the term "Cycladic civilization". Interest lagged, and then picked up in the mid-20th century, as collectors competed for the modern-looking figures that seemed so similar to sculpture by Jean Arp or Constantin Brâncuși. Sites were looted and a brisk trade in forgeries arose. The context for many of these Cycladic figurines has been mostly destroyed and their meaning may never be completely understood. 

Another intriguing and mysterious object is that of the Cycladic frying pans. More accurate archaeology has revealed the broad outlines of a farming and seafaring culture that had emigrated from Anatolia c. 5000 BCE. Early Cycladic culture evolved in three phases, between c. 3300 – 2000 BCE, when it was increasingly swamped in the rising influence of Minoan Crete. The culture of mainland Greece contemporary with Cycladic culture is known as the Helladic period.

In recent decades the Cyclades have become popular with European and other tourists, and as a result there have been problems with erosion, pollution, and water shortages.

Geography

The Cyclades includes about 220 islands, the major ones being Amorgos, Anafi, Andros, Antiparos, Delos, Ios, Kea, Kimolos, Kythnos, Milos, Mykonos, Naxos, Paros, Folegandros, Serifos, Sifnos, Sikinos, Syros, Tinos, and Thira or Santoríni. There are also many minor islands (the Lesser Cyclades) including Donousa, Eschati, Gyaros, Irakleia, Koufonisia, Makronisos, Rineia, and Schoinousa. The name "Cyclades" refers to the islands forming a circle ("circular islands") around the sacred island of Delos. Most of the smaller islands are uninhabited.

Ermoupoli on Syros is the chief town and administrative center of the former prefecture.

The islands are peaks of a submerged mountainous terrain, with the exception of two volcanic islands, Milos and Santorini. The climate is generally dry and mild, but with the exception of Naxos, the soil is not very fertile; agricultural produce includes wine, fruit, wheat, olive oil, and tobacco. Lower temperatures are registered in higher elevations and these areas do not usually see wintry weather.

The Cyclades are bounded to the south by the Sea of Crete.

Administration

The Cyclades Prefecture was one of the prefectures of Greece. As a part of the 2011 Kallikratis government reform, the prefecture was abolished, and its territory was divided into nine regional units of the South Aegean region:

 Andros
 Kea-Kythnos
 Milos
 Mykonos
 Naxos
 Paros
 Thira
 Syros
 Tinos

Municipalities and communities

The prefecture was subdivided into the following municipalities and communities. These have been reorganised at the 2011 Kallikratis reform as well.

Provinces

 Province of Amorgos: Amorgos
 Province of Andros: Andros
 Province of Kea: Ioulis
 Province of Milos: Milos
 Province of Naxos: Naxos
 Province of Paros: Paroikia
 Province of Syros: Ermoupoli
 Province of Tinos: Tinos
 Province of Thira: Thira

Note: Provinces no longer hold any legal status in Greece.

Cuisine
Local specialities of the Cyclades include:

 Brantáda, cod fillet fish dish
 Fava Santorinis (made from Lathyrus clymenum)
 Fourtalia (Andros), omelette
 Kakavia (soup)
 Matsata, pasta
 Kalasouna (Naxos)
 Kalogeros (Naxos)
 Tomatokeftedes
 Various cheeses, such as Kopanisti Mykonou, Manoura Sifnou, Armexia, Malaxia, Chloro, San Michali etc
 Loutza, similar to the Cypriot lountza
 Strapatsada (Koskosela)
 Sfougato (omelette)
 Lazarakia (dessert)
 Melitinia (dessert)
 Melopita (dessert)
 Santorini (wine)

See also 

 Aegean cat
 List of islands of Greece
 Minoan eruption
 Mosaics of Delos
 Nisiotika music
 Santorini wine

Notes

References

External links

 Jeremy B. Rutter, "The Prehistoric Archaeology of the Aegean": especially Lessons 2 and 4: chronology, history, bibliography
 Cyclades The Official website of the Greek National Tourism Organisation

 
Aegean islands
Archipelagoes of Greece
Prefectures of Greece
Landforms of the South Aegean
Cyclades